Wabo Olivier Kamdem (born 15 October 2002) is a French professional footballer who plays as a midfielder and full-back for  club Clermont.

Personal life
Born in France, Kamdem is of Cameroonian descent.

References

External links 
 
 
 

2002 births
Living people
Footballers from Marseille
French footballers
French sportspeople of Cameroonian descent
Black French sportspeople
Association football midfielders
Association football fullbacks
Clermont Foot players
Championnat National 3 players